Tippen, also known as Dreiblatt, Dreikart, Drei Karten, Dreekort, Kleinpréférence or Labet, is an historical German 3-card, plain-trick game which was popular as a gambling game for three or more players. The Danish version of the game was known as Trekort and more elaborate Swedish variants include Knack and Köpknack. It appears to be related to the English game of 3-Card Loo. It was banned as a gambling game in some places.

History and etymology
The game was described in 19th century anthologies and encyclopedias but appears related to 3-card Loo, which was already described in the 18th century. In some locations the game was illegal. 

Dreiblatt is recorded as early as 1807 as a gambling game in which players received three cards, and Tippen is mentioned in 1790 as a gambling game similar to Grobhäusern and Trischak, and in 1816 as a German card game, but the earliest description of the rules appears in 1821 in Das neue Königliche l'Hombre as Drei Karten ("Three Cards") along with a variant called Loup or Wolf (loup being French word "wolf"), described below.

Tippen is German for tapping and refers to the practice of players tapping on the table to indicate that they intend to "play" and not "pass" i.e. drop out of the current game. Dreiblatt or Drei Karten refers to the 3 cards each player is dealt. In an 1829 Danish game anthology a variant was described under the name Trekort.

Tippen is described in the 1905 edition of Meyers Lexikon as follows:

Cards 
Tippen is played with a 32-card  Piquet pack. The suits are illustrated in the table below. Card ranking is: Ace >  King >  Queen > Jack > Ten > Nine > Eight > Seven.

Rules
The following rule sets indicate the development of the game from the early 19th century to the present. Note that, although most sources cite three to five players, Pierer suggests the game is also playable by two or up to ten players. Von Alvensleben says that more than five players require a 'whist pack'.

Drei Karten (1821) 
The earliest known rules appeared in 1821 under the name Drei Karten ("three cards") and describe the game as follows:

"Drei Karten. This is played between 3 to 6 people. The dealer antes 3 tokens, gives each person one card, three times in succession, the ninth, which belongs to him, determines trumps. Everyone must play the first hand. Anyone who fails to take a trick pays, the first time, 3 tokens, and thereafter as much as is in the pool. When there is a bête, anyone may pass. In this game you can lose with 2 trumps, and make 2 tricks without a single trump."

Dreiblatt or Tippen (1859) 
In 1859, Alvensleben gives a more detailed account of the game under the names of Dreiblatt, Dreikarten or Tippen. He also notes that it was sometimes played with four cards and known as Vierblatt to evade anti-gambling laws.

Preliminaries 
The game is played by 3 to 6 players using a Piquet pack of 32 cards, or by more players using a Whist pack of 52 cards. Players choose any seat and the first dealer is the one who is dealt an Ace. 
The dealer antes a basic game stake (Kartenstamm) of 3 tokens (Marken) and deals each player 3 cards individually. The next is turned as trumps.

Bidding 
When there is only a basic stake in the pool, everyone must play until there is a bête. For each trick won, a token is paid from the pot (Pot). Anyone who fails to make a trick, antes a bête equal to the basic stake. When there is a bête in the pot, players may choose to play or pass; if a player passes, he throws his cards, face down, on the table; if he plays, he undertakes to make at least one trick and does this by saying "I'm playing" (ich spiele) or tapping (tippen) his finger on the table. Each player that takes a trick receives one third of the bête and anyone who fails to take a trick must double the pot. All new bêtes are added to any existing ones.

Play 
Players must follow suit if possible, otherwise may trump if able. If the trick has already been trumped, they may overtrump or discard as they please. If there are at least three active players, the first must lead a trump. If the player who took the first trick has the trump Deuce, he must lead it to the second trick.

To limit the size of the pot, players usually agree a maximum bête. Everything above that is set aside for the next or subsequent deals along with the basic stake anted by the dealer.

Variations 
Alvensleben records the following variations:

 Robbing (rauben) must be agreed beforehand. A player who holds the seven of trumps may rob the trump upcard before play begins.

 Sniffing (riechen) is when the dealer has the right to swap the trump upcard for a hand card that he then discards face down. The dealer must announce this by saying "I'm sniffing" (ich rieche!) and he must then play, unless he exercises the option to drop out and pay a simple bête i.e. a single stake. If he plays and takes no tricks, he pays a double bête.

 Hop and jump (Hupf und Sprung) is the feature that when the pack is cut, the lowest card is viewed and the deal passes to the next player if it is an Ace or Seven. This is done to raise the contents of the pot because the new dealer must also ante the basic stake. With this variation, players are not forced to play when there is only a basic stake in the pot.

Tippen (20th century) 
The following modern rules are based on Grupp (1975) and Katira (1983) which are identical apart from the method of dealing and the penalty for taking no tricks.

Preliminaries 
Three to five players play with a 32-card Piquet pack. The cards rank in the natural order (aces highs) - see above. Dealing and play are clockwise. Dealer pays 3 chips into the pot (Pott, Topf or Kasse), shuffles, offers the cut to rearhand (to his right), deals 3 cards, one at a time, to each player, and turns the next card for trumps (Grupp). Alternatively, he may deal 2 cards, one at a time, to each player and turn the next for trumps before dealing one more card each (Katira).

Bidding and exchanging 
Players now examine their hands, assess whether they can take at least one trick and bid to "play" or "pass". If they pass, they lay their cards face down on the table. If they want to play, they tippen i.e. tap their fingers on the table. If all pass, the next dealer also pays a stake, shuffles, offers the cut and redeals. If only one player tipps, he wins the pot, the dealer rotates and a new deal begins.

Each active player, beginning with forehand, may now exchange up to 3 cards, laying their discard(s) face down; the dealer then gives them the same number of cards from the talon.

Play 
Forehand, or the next active player sitting after the dealer in clockwise order, leads to the first trick. Players must follow suit; trump if unable and head the trick if possible. If unable to do any of those, they may discard any card.  

The aim is to win at least 2 of the 3 tricks. Each won trick is worth a third of the pot. Any active player who fails to win a single trick must pay a bête equivalent to the contents of the pot (Katira) or the basic stake of 3 chips (Grupp).

Variations 
Grupp and Katira mention the following as variations:

 Force called Tipp-Zwang is played when there is only the basic stake in the pot.
 Shoving (schieben). The dealer pays the ante but may 'shove' the cards to his left for the next player to add another ante and then deal. That player may also shove.
 Knocking. The dealer has the right to 'knock' on the - as yet unfaced - trump card before looking at his own hand. He picks the trump up without revealing it, announces the trump suit, picks up his hand and discards a card. A dealer who knocks and fails to take a trick pays a double stake. If he takes just one trick he pays a single stake.
 Sniffing (riechen). All is as in von Alvensleben's account, except that the requirement to sniff before looking at one's hand is not explicit.

Variants

Vierblatt or Mauscheln 

Where the game was illegal under its name Dreiblatt, players sometimes played a variant with a hand of 4 cards. This was a game in its own right known variously as Vierblatt, Angehen or (especially in south Germany and Austria) Mauscheln. Today, Mauscheln is common in Austria and south Germany, unlike Tippen which is not played in Austria, but still played in Germany.

Loup or Wolf 
Loup or Wolf was a variant for up to 5 players in which each was dealt 6 cards. The dealer paid 6 chips to the pot, each trick won earning one chip unless a bête has been paid to the pot. The game is recorded in the 1821 and 1841 editions of Das Neue Königliche l'Hombre.

See also 
 Vierblatt
 Zwicken

Footnotes

References

Literature 
 _ (1821). Das neue Königliche l’Hombre nebst einer gründlichen Anweisung, 16th revised edition, Herold & Wahlstab, Lüneburg.
.
 Campe, Joachim Heinrich (1807). Wörterbuch der Deutschen Sprache. Volume 1. Brunswick.
 Geiser, Remigius (2004). "100 Kartenspiele des Landes Salzburg", in Talon, Issue 13.
 Grupp, Claus D (1975/1979). Karten-spiele, Falken, Niederhausen. 
 Heinsius, Theodor (1818). Volksthümliches Wörterbuch der deutschen Sprache, Volume 1 (A–E). Hanover: Hahn.
 .
 Katira, Kay Uwe (1983). Verbotene Kartenspiele. Wilhelm Heyne, Munich. 
 Meyer, Joseph (1909). "Tippen". Meyers Großes Konversations-Lexikon, Volume 19. Leipzig, p. 564.
 
 Pierer, H. A. (1863). "Tippen" in Pierer's Universal-Lexikon, Volume 17. Altenburg.

External links 
 Dreiblatt at www.neuropool.com.

German card games
Gambling games
Rams group
French deck card games
Austrian card games
Multi-player card games
19th-century card games